The 1961 Gael Linn Cup is a representative competition for elite level participants in the women's team field sport of camogie, was won by Munster, who defeated Connacht in the final, played at Pearse Park Galway.

Arrangements
Leinster suffered their first defeat in the competition surprisingly losing the semi-final Connacht by 7–3 to 5–1 at Pearse Park. A dramatic late goal by Kathleen Downes helped Munster defeat Ulster by 4–1 to 2–6 at Roscrea, Munster own their first title by 5–2 to 1–0 against Connacht in heavy rain at Pearse Park.
The breach of Leinster dominance was regarded as a healthy development just as interest in inter-provincial camogie showed a danger of waning.Agnes Hourigan wrote in the Irish Press: As Leinster won this competition in all previous years since its inauguration, the trophy must have new holders this season, which is all to the good, for the dominance of Leinster in the cup must eventually have killed the competition from the standpoint of public interest.

Final stages

|}

References

External links
 Camogie Association

1961 in camogie
1961